All Saints Roman Catholic Secondary School is a comprehensive, co-educational, Roman Catholic state school situated in Barmulloch the north-east of Glasgow, Scotland. Established in 1972, the school was rebuilt into a newer, more modern version in 2002, with better facilities but fewer classrooms. The headteacher is Brian McDermott.

Houses 
The school also has 5 houses each named after the five Roman Catholic saints linked to All Saints. St Augustine's, St Monica's, St Philomena's, St Aloysius', and St Catherine's.

Notable former pupils

Frank McAveety (b.1962) - Labour politician
Allan Campbell (footballer) - Scottish footballer
Paul Martin MSP - former Member of the Scottish Parliament for Glasgow Springburn constituency from 1999-2011 and Glasgow Provan from 2011-2016.

References 

Educational institutions established in 1972
Catholic secondary schools in Glasgow
1972 establishments in Scotland
Springburn